Flight 1907 may refer to:

 Kazakhstan Airlines Flight 1907 (1996), collided with Saudia Flight 763 (a Boeing 747) and crashed near Delhi, India due to lack of an airborne collision avoidance system.
 Gol Transportes Aéreos Flight 1907 (2006), collided with ExcelAire business jet (an Embraer Legacy 600) in Brazilian airspace over Mato Grosso
(both Mid-air collisions)

1907